This is a listing of notable people born in, or notable for their association with, Riau.



B
 Sutardji Calzoum Bachri, poet (Indragiri Hulu)

J
 Defri Juliant, dangdut singer

O
 Leani Ratri Oktila, para-badminton athlete

S
 Darwin Zahedy Saleh, Minister of Energy and Mineral Resources (Indragiri Hilir)
 Abdul Somad, Islamic preacher
 Atika Suri, TV newscasters and newscast producer (Indragiri Hulu)
 Syamsuar, politician, governor of Riau for 2019–2024 (Rokan Hilir)

Riau